Poulton-le-Fylde Market Cross, in the English market town of Poulton-le-Fylde, Lancashire, was likely erected in the 17th century. Standing at the southern end of Market Place, it is a Grade II listed structure.

It is a Tuscan column constructed of stone, consisting of three tapered cylinders on a square pedestal, which in turn sits on a circular plinth of four steps. On top of the cylinders is a ball finial with a cross. The cross is similar to those at Kirkland and Garstang and is situated between the stocks and the fish stones.

References

Sources

External links
A 19th-century view of the market cross

Buildings and structures in Poulton-le-Fylde
Grade II listed buildings in Lancashire
Market crosses in England